To hallow is "to make holy or sacred, to sanctify or consecrate, to venerate". The adjective form hallowed, as used in The Lord's Prayer, means holy, consecrated, sacred, or revered. The noun form hallow, as used in Hallowtide, is a synonym of the word saint. 

The word 'to hallow' itself in English is now archaic; does not appear other than in the quoted text in the Lord's Prayer in the New Testament ( and ).

Etymology

The noun is from the Old English adjective hālig, nominalised as se hālga "the holy man". The Gothic word for "holy" is either hailags or weihaba, weihs. "To hold as holy" or "to become holy" is weihnan, "to make holy, to sanctify" is weihan. Holiness or sanctification is weihiþa. Old English, like Gothic, had a second term of similar meaning, wēoh "holy", with a substantive wīh or wīg, Old High German wīh or wīhi (Middle High German  wîhe, Modern German Weihe). The Nordendorf fibula has wigiþonar, interpreted as wīgi-þonar "holy Donar" or "sacred to Donar". Old Norse vé is a type of shrine. The weihs group is cognate to Latin victima, an animal dedicated to the gods and destined to be sacrificed.

Usage
Hallow, as a noun, is a synonym of the word saint. In modern English usage, the noun "hallow" appears mostly in the compound Hallowtide, a liturgical season which includes the days of Halloween and Hallowmas. Halloween (or Hallowe'en) is a shortened form of "All Hallow Even," meaning "All Hallows' Eve" or "All Saints' Eve." Hallowmas, the day after Halloween, is shortened from "Hallows' Mass," and is also known as "All Hallows' Day" or "All Saints' Day."

a

See also
 Harry Potter and the Deathly Hallows
 Hörgr
 Numen
 Numinous
 The Thirteen Hallows

References

Holiness